Tinko Simov was a Bulgarian revolutionary from Balgarene, Lovech Province. Georged Balkanski called him the anarchist Bulgarian revolutionary who fought in secret for the longest time. He was a part of a number of anarchists groups and was a founder of the anarchist guerrilla group, Guéroïa. Among his most frequent collaborators were Vasil Popov, Georges Popov, Vassil Ikonomov, and  Georges Cheïtanov. He also wrote poetry, for example his poem about the revolutionary struggle, Не беснейте властелини.

Simov refused to take part in the First and Second Balkan Wars, for which he was jailed. He succeeded in escaping, and afterward supported the agitation from the leftist parties against Bulgarian intervention in the First World War. After the war Simov was freed and began working in Gorna Oryahovitza. He took part in the transport strike of 1919. During the 9th of June coup he was in Pleven, arrested and interned in Balgarene.

After the St Nedelya Church assault in April 1925, he became increasingly radical and active in anti-government groups. He came into contact with Vasil Popov, with whom he created an anti-government guerrilla group of anarchists and communists Guéroïa. In 1924 and 1925, many anarchist groups fled to the west, but Simov and Popov remained in Bulgaria. On November 23, 1925, Simov led an attack on the city governments of the villages of Balgarene and Kazachevo. In 1927, they attempted to rob the Zemedelska Bank in Troyan. In the ensuing firefight Popov, heavily wounded, reputedly killed himself in order to avoid capture. Simov escaped. In 1928 Simov became the head of another small group of anarchists and communists. Pressured by police prosecutions, the group fled to Yugoslavia. In the ensuing years, Simov traveled throughout Europe, searching for connections with other anarchist organizations. In 1934 he returned to Bulgaria and made attempts to resurrect his activities without much success. There are multiple accounts of his death. In one, he hid for some time in the village of Lomec, Troyan. In 1935 his hideout was surrounded by the police, but heavily wounded he still managed to escape. He came back to Balgarene, where he hid in a barn for several days. After a betrayal, the police yet again surrounded Simov and during the firefight he killed himself. In another, he was killed by Stalinists after they took power in 1944. There was a photograph of a cadaver reproduced in the press of that time and said to be Simov, but that may have been the body of one of Simov's collaborator.

References

Sources
 Balkanski , Georges (Georgi Grigorov), G. Cheïtanov: pages d'histoire du mouvement libertaire bulgare, Editions "Notre Route", 1965
 Даскалов, Дончо (Daskalov, Doncho). Анархизмът в България. Унив. изд-во "Св. Климент Охридски, 1995
 Notre Route, Bulgaria, 1952
 Obshtestvo i pravo, Sŭi͡uz na i͡uristite v Bŭlgarii͡a, 1993
 Pavlevski, Konstantin. Nelegalen dnevnik. Voen. izd-vo, 1989
 http://bgvesti.com/index.php?option=com_content&view=article&id=33307:2009-06-28-15-22-00&catid=51:2008-09-17-19-36-54&Itemid=104

1887 births
1935 deaths
1935 suicides
Anarcho-communists
Bulgarian anarchists
People from Lovech Province
Suicides by firearm
Suicides in Bulgaria